The Stein Rokkan Prize for Comparative Social Science Research is an academic honour awarded by the International Science Council, the University of Bergen and the European Consortium for Political Research, in memory of the political scientist and sociologist Stein Rokkan. It is awarded to scholars making "a very substantial and original contribution in comparative social science research". These contributions can be in the form of book-length, unpublished manuscripts, published books, or collections of works published no more than two years prior to the award year. The prize is awarded annually and is worth $5000.

According to a reputation survey conducted in 2013 and 2014, the Stein Rokkan Prize is the second most prestigious international academic award in political science, after the Johan Skytte Prize in Political Science. A reputation survey conducted in 2018 found the Stein Rokkan Prize to be the most prestigious interdisciplinary award in the social sciences (jointly with the Holberg Prize).

Prizewinners
Sources: The European Consortium for Political Research, the European University Institute and the International Social Science Council

See also

 List of social sciences awards

References

External links
Stein Rokkan Prize, European Consortium for Political Research

Awards established in 1981
Academic awards
Political science awards
Political science organizations
Social sciences awards
Sociology awards